The Mayor of Sejong City is the head of the local government of Sejong City who is elected to a four-year term.

List of mayors

Elections 
Source:

2012 (by-election)

2014

2018

2022

See also 
 Government of South Korea
 Politics of South Korea

References 

Sejong City
Lists of political office-holders in South Korea